Duncan Black, FBA (23 May 1908 – 14 January 1991) was a Scottish economist who laid the foundations of social choice theory. In particular he was responsible for unearthing the work of many early political scientists, including Charles Lutwidge Dodgson, and was responsible for the Black electoral system, a Condorcet method whereby, in the absence of a Condorcet winner (e.g. due to a cycle), the Borda winner is chosen.

Biography
Black was born in Motherwell, Scotland, an industrial town south east of Glasgow, to a working-class family. He graduated from the Dalziel High School in Motherwell and  then studied mathematics and physics at the University of Glasgow. He then enrolled for a degree in economics and politics which he finished with first class honours in 1932.  He started teaching at the newly formed Dundee School of Economics (later part of the  University of Dundee). There Black was influenced by his colleague Ronald Coase, originator of the Theory of the Firm. He later taught at the University College of North Wales (now Bangor University) and Glasgow.

Black also had visiting positions in the United States, at the universities of Rochester, Chicago, Virginia and Michigan State. These occurred after William H. Riker reviewed his work in 1961. He was elected a Foreign Honorary Member of the American Academy of Arts and Sciences in 1980.

Archives
The archives for Duncan Black are maintained by the  Archives of the University of Glasgow (GUAS).

See also
 Median voter theorem
 Public choice theory

References

Further reading
 
 
 Bernard Grofman (1987 [2008]), "Black, Duncan," The New Palgrave: A Dictionary of Economics, v. 1, pp. 250–51.

1908 births
1991 deaths
Scottish economists
Alumni of the University of Glasgow
Fellows of the Econometric Society
Fellows of the American Academy of Arts and Sciences
Voting theorists
20th-century British economists
Fellows of the British Academy